Howard Allen Smith (October 8, 1909 – June 4, 1998) was a Republican representative from California from 1957 to 1973.

Biography 
Born in Dixon, Lee County, Illinois, October 8, 1909, (Ronald Reagan's boyhood hometown) Smith was an F.B.I. agent and later a member of the California State Assembly for the 43rd district from 1949 to 1957, a Presidential Elector for California in 1956, and a representative from California's 43rd congressional district from 1957 to 1973.

Tenure 
In Congress he compiled a conservative voting record. Smith voted in favor of the Civil Rights Acts of 1957 and 1960, as well as the 24th Amendment to the U.S. Constitution, but voted against the Civil Rights Acts of 1964 and 1968 and the Voting Rights Act of 1965. He was also a delegate from California to the Republican National Convention in 1960. Member, Freemasons; Shriners.

Death
He died in Glendale on June 4, 1998, and is interred at Forest Lawn Memorial Park in Glendale.
He was married to Elizabeth Smith. They had two sons, Lauren and Stephen Smith.

References

External links
Join California H. Allen Smith

Republican Party members of the California State Assembly
Federal Bureau of Investigation agents
1909 births
1998 deaths
Republican Party members of the United States House of Representatives from California
1956 United States presidential electors
20th-century American politicians